Heqing Town is a rural town in Lengshuijiang, Hunan, China.

Administrative division
The town is divided into 22 villages and 4 communities, the following areas: 
 Baoxing Community
 Lifu Community
 Qiuxi Community
 Shuangxing Community
 Heqing Village
 Hexing Village
 Huangni Village
 Shuangxing Village
 Lifu Village
 Yangping Village
 Huangchang Village
 Qiuxi Village
 Shexueli Village
 Ruijiang Village
 Luzhu Village
 Liuli Village
 Dongshang Village
 Shuitang Village
 Changchong Village
 Miaotian Village
 Tongzhong Village
 Maoshan Village
 Shishan Village
 Qiaotou Village
 Hongyun Village
 Jianxin Village

Geography
Zi River, also known as the mother river, flows through the town.

Transportation

Expressway
The S70 Loudi–Huaihua Expressway, more commonly known as "Louhuai Expressway", is a west-east highway passing through the town.

Railway
The Shanghai–Kunming high-speed railway passes across the town southeast to northwest.

References

Divisions of Lengshuijiang